Alexei Sergeyevich Ivanov (born 4 May 1988) is a Kazakhstani professional ice hockey goaltender. He currently plays with Barys Astana in the Kontinental Hockey League (KHL).

International
Ivanov was named to the Kazakhstan men's national ice hockey team for competition at the 2014 IIHF World Championship.

References

External links 

1988 births
Sportspeople from Omsk
Barys Nur-Sultan players
Daemyung Killer Whales players
Kazakhstani ice hockey goaltenders
HK Poprad players
Living people
HC Spartak Moscow players
Russian ice hockey goaltenders
Russian expatriate sportspeople in Canada
Kazakhstani expatriate sportspeople in Canada
Expatriate ice hockey players in Canada
Russian expatriate sportspeople in South Korea
Kazakhstani expatriate sportspeople in South Korea
Expatriate ice hockey players in South Korea
Russian expatriate sportspeople in Slovakia
Kazakhstani expatriate sportspeople in Slovakia
Expatriate ice hockey players in Slovakia
Russian expatriate sportspeople in the United Arab Emirates
Kazakhstani expatriate sportspeople in the United Arab Emirates
Expatriate ice hockey players in the United Arab Emirates
Russian expatriate ice hockey people
Kazakhstani expatriate ice hockey people